The Icknield Way Path or Icknield Way Trail is a long distance footpath and riding route in East Anglia, England.  The ancient Icknield Way itself is unique among long-distance trails because it can claim to be ‘the oldest road in Britain’. It consists of prehistoric pathways, ancient when the Romans came; the route is dotted with archaeological remains. It survives today in splendid tracks and green lanes along the ‘chalk spine’ of southern England.

The Icknield Way Path runs for 110 miles (177 km) from the end of the Ridgeway at Ivinghoe Beacon in Buckinghamshire, to the start of the Peddars Way at Knettishall Heath in Suffolk.  The Icknield Way Association has aimed to find the most pleasant route for walking, as close as possible to the general line of the ancient Icknield Way.

The Path connects with: Angles Way, Bunyan Trail, Chiltern Way, Harcamlow Way, Hertfordshire Chain Walk, Hertfordshire Way, Peddars Way, Ridgeway, the Roman Road, Cambridgeshire, Stour Valley Path and Swan's Way.

The path was devised by the Icknield Way Association and supported by the Ramblers Association. It was part of a plan to achieve National Trail status for the whole length of the ancient trackways linking the South Coast and The Wash.  The Icknield Way is part of a family of routes forming the coast to coast route which is now promoted as the Great Chalk Way. The path was recognised by local authorities in 1992. The association was founded by Charles Thurstan Shaw, archaeologist and long-distance walker, in 1984, the same year he produced the first walker’s guide to the route.

In 2004 the Icknield Way was further developed into a multi-use route so that most of the route is also available for horse riders and off-road cyclists providing a complete walking and riding link between the two National Trails.  Crossing six counties, the Icknield Way Trail is a 170-mile (274 km) route linking the Peddars Way National Trail in Suffolk with the Ridgeway National Trail in Buckinghamshire, which in turn links with the Wessex Ridgeway.  Wherever possible the Icknield Way Trail follows the walkers' route, the Icknield Way Path, but diverges at several locations to ensure the Icknield Way Trail follows bridleways, byways and where necessary roads.  Walkers can pass over footpaths and therefore can access more direct and/or scenic routes.

Commencing at Ivinghoe Beacon with places en route: Dagnall, Whipsnade Tree Cathedral, Dunstable Downs, Dunstable, Houghton Regis, Wingfield, Chalgrave, Toddington, M1 motorway, Upper Sundon, Streatley, Warden Hills, Galley and Warden Hills, Pirton, Ickleford, Letchworth, Baldock, Wallington, Sandon, Therfield, Royston, Heydon, Elmdon, Great Chesterford, Linton, Balsham, Burrough Green, Stetchworth, Cheveley, Ashley, Dalham, Gazeley, Tuddenham, Icklingham, Euston and finishing at Knettishall Heath Country Park.

References

External links
Icknield Way Path
Icknield Way Trail
Great Chalk Way
Walking Pages
Trekking on the Icknield Way

Long-distance footpaths in England

Footpaths in Suffolk
Footpaths in Cambridgeshire

Footpaths in Hertfordshire
Footpaths in Buckinghamshire

de:Icknield Way#Icknield Way Path